Constant Bar (14 October 1817, Nantes – June 1884, Paramaribo) was a French entomologist.

Constant Bar lived in French Guiana at L'île Portal in the commune of Saint-Laurent-du-Maroni and with his three brothers made extensive entomological explorations of that region, collecting specimens for his own studies and for Charles Oberthür and others. He wrote "Note critique sur les différent systèmes de classification des lépidoptères rhopalocères établis depuis l'époque de Latreille et essai d'une nouvelle classification jusqu'aux genres exclusivement" for the Annales de la Societé entomologique de France in 1878. In 1854 he became a member of the Société entomologique de France.

He is honoured in the names Hypercompe bari, Heliconia bari and Parides lysander bari.

References
Dimmock, G. 1885: [Biography] Psyche, Cambridge/Mass. 4:266
Honrath, E. G. 1887: [Bar, C.] Berliner Entomologische Zeitschrift, Berlin 31:151–152
Honrath, E. G. 1888: [Bar, C.] Berliner Entomologische Zeitschrift, Berlin 32:13–14
Lefèvre, E. 1884: [Bar, C.] Annales de la Société Entomologique de France (6), Paris 4:CLVII
Oberthür, C. 1886: [Bar, C.] Annales de la Société Entomologique de France (6), Paris 6 Suppl. 1–12.
Oberthür, C. 1916: [Bar, C.] Etudes de lepidopterologie comparée 9 (with portrait)

French lepidopterists
1884 deaths
1817 births
Scientists from Nantes
19th-century French zoologists
People from Saint-Laurent-du-Maroni
Date of death missing